Lioplax is a genus of freshwater snail with a gill and an operculum, an aquatic gastropod mollusk in the family Viviparidae.

Species
Species within the genus  Lioplax include: 
 Lioplax cyclostomaformis, otherwise known as the "cylindrical lioplax"

References

Viviparidae
Taxonomy articles created by Polbot